Kalaba can refer to:

Kalaba, another name for the clay mineral kaolin 
Kalaba-X, a constructed language
Rainford Kalaba, a Zambian footballer
 Kalaba, Hani
 Kalaba, Sivrice
 Kalaba, Nevşehir, a town in Nevşehir Province, Turkey